Corey Warren Cuelho (born 27 April 2000) is an Australian footballer currently playing as a midfielder for UD Llanera.

Cuelho enjoyed a stellar junior career at Marconi Stallions, frequently scoring goals from midfield at every junior level. 

Cuelho was mistakenly referred to as "Corey Warren" in his SPL registration documents. Warren is his middle name.

Career statistics

Club

Notes

References

External links
Lietuvos Futbolas player profile
Cyprus Football Association player profile

Living people
2000 births
Australian soccer players
Australian expatriate soccer players
Association football midfielders
Singapore Premier League players
Geylang International FC players
FC Vilniaus Vytis players
Australian expatriate sportspeople in Singapore
Expatriate footballers in Singapore
Australian expatriate sportspeople in Lithuania
Expatriate footballers in Lithuania
Australian expatriate sportspeople in Cyprus
Expatriate footballers in Cyprus